Silvia Bächli (born 1956) is a Swiss visual artist, photographer, and educator. She works primarily in painting and drawing. She has taught art at the Academy of Fine Arts, Karlsruhe since 1993.

Biography 
Silvia Bächli was born on 16 March 1956 in Wettingen, Baden District, Aargau, Switzerland. She attended Haute École d'Arts Appliques de Bâle, and École Supérieure des Beaux-Arts, Genève.

In 2009, her work was part of the Swiss pavilion at the 53rd Venice Biennale. Bächli has received many awards and honors including the Manor Cultural Prize in the Canton of Aargau in 1990, Montres Breguet Prize for contemporary art in 1991, the Meret-Oppenheim Prize in 2003, and the drawing prize from the Daniel and Florence Guerlain Fondation d’Art Contemporain in 2007.

Her work can be found in museum collections, including at the Museum of Modern Art in New York City.

See also 

 List of Swiss painters

References

External links 
 Official website

1956 births
Living people
Swiss women artists
People from Baden District, Aargau
Alumni of the École Supérieure des Beaux-Arts, Genève
Academic staff of the Academy of Fine Arts, Karlsruhe
20th-century Swiss women artists
21st-century Swiss women artists